Rajaraja Cholan is a 1973 Indian Tamil-language biographical film directed by A. P. Nagarajan and written by Aru Ramanathan. Based on Ramanathan's play of the same name about the life of the Chola king Rajaraja I, the film stars Sivaji Ganesan in the title role and was the first Tamil CinemaScope film. It was released on 31 March 1973, and ran for over 100 days in theatres.

Plot 

While the Brihadeswara Temple in Thanjavur is being constructed, Emperor Rajaraja Cholan arrives, everyone greets him but a sculptor, whose dedication pleases him. The emperor and empress leave to meet Karuvur Devar and are introduced to Tamizarasi, a poet and drama writer.

Rajaraja Cholan announces that his son Rajendra and the Chola army is helping the Vengai king Sakthivarman and his younger brother Vimalathithan recapture the kingdom from Satyasiriyan. Satyasiriyan runs back into his palace whose minister, Bala Devar, devises a plan to destroy Raja Raja Chola. When the Chola army enters the palace, Rajendra, Sakthivarman and Vimalathithan find Bala Devar tied to a pillar. He claims he asked Satyasiriyan to not fight but he never listened and he was about to get killed by Sataysiriyan when the Chola army entered the palace and Satyasiriyan ran away. After revealing one of the soldier's is Rajaraja Cholan in disguise, Rajaraja declares Bala Devar as his minister in spite of others not trusting him. Rajaraja leaves for the capital with Bala Devar.

Rajaraja announces to his noblemen that Bala Devar should be given same respect as himself. A lady comes to meet Bala devar and announces she is Poonkodi from the same village as him. Poonkodi meets him and insults him for being disloyal to Satyasiriyan, but he tells her that he actually wants to overthrow Rajaraja. They both work together and he asks her to stay back in the Chola capital.

Kundavi is informed by Rajendra that he got a special gift when Vimalathithan enters. Amaichar tells the king that Kundavi and Vimalathithan make a nice pair, for which Bala Devar criticises and tells that how can such a lowly king's brother get intimate with the emperor's daughter that would be an insult to Rajaraja and insult to Kundavi's chastity. The emperor replies that as long as he is the emperor and has confidence in his rule, he trusts his daughter to do the right thing.

Rajaraja goes to the temple, where Nambiyandar Nambi comes to pay his respects. He tells that via divine intervention, Nambi found the presence of script in Thillai Nataraja Temple, Chidambaram, which are the great works of saints Sampantar, Appar and Sundarar. Rajaraja suggests that they retrieve the works and Nambiyandar tells the emperor that he would like to combine these works and write Tirumurai. The Emperor, his sister and Nambi go to Chidambaram temple to open the chamber, but the priest Dikshitar informs them that all three saints have to come to open the chamber. Rajaraja's men get three palanquins and he opens them to show the golden statues of the saint-poets. the priest asks how can these statues be saints? Rajaraja responds by saying, if the golden statue of Nataraja is God himself then why can't these statues be saints? These saints have no death, as they are eternal due to their works. The priest relents and gives the keys to the chamber where Rajaraja and Nambi find the moth-eaten scriptures.

Bala Devar lets Satyasiriyan through a secret passage into his house in the Chola capital, and is asked about the Chola emperor and when his son could marry Kundavi..

Rajaraja admonishes Vimalathithan as his elder brother appears too busy to pay respects to the emperor, and Vimalathithan defends him. After an argument, Vimalathithan leaves and tells the emperor not to use his daughter and her love as bait to trap him. Kundavi is heartbroken, but swears that a person who does not respect her father shall not be her husband. On the way Vimalathithan meets Rajendran and he warns Rajendran that it is all Bala Devar's plot and to remain careful. Rajendran tries to confront his father, but Rajajraja dismisses him.

The temple is completed and the emperor announces that his daughter Kundavi shall perform her Arangaitram on the temple opening day. The emperor, at Bala Devar's insistence, does not send an invitation to Vengi or Vimalathithan. Rajendra decides not to attend the event after hearing this. On the day Vimalathithan arrives and informs the emperor that as he was not invited he shall sit along with the common people to watch Kundavi's dance. Kundavi dances but makes a mistake that Vimalathithan points out. Rajaraja tells him it is enough that he insulted his daughter. Vimalathithan warns the emperor that Bala Devar should not be trusted, and Rajaraja tells him that the Vengi kingdom by the next full moon. Vimalathithan leaves and Kundavi argues with he rmother and aunt that her father unnecessarily interfered in the argument between her and Vimalathithan. Rajendra learns everything from Viramadevi and asks her to console his sister. He confronts his father, who informs Rajendra that he shall lead the army to attack the Vengi king. Rajendra refuses to do it, and gives his sword to his father. When he leaves. Bala Devar says that Rajendra's mind changed because of Viramadevi and made him soft. Viramadevi vows that she will stop loving Rajendra as she cannot bear such accusations. Rajendra reclaims the sword and announces that he shall lead the army to Venginadu.

The Chola army is goes to the Vengi kingdom, and Rajendran tells Vimalathithan he has no choice but to fight. Rajaraja, disguised as a sage, appears and asks them why make the armies fight and lead to so many people's deaths, when only Rajendran and Vimalathithan should fight. Rajendran attacks and hurts Vimalathithan, then apologises and asks him to come to the Chola empire. When they reach the emperor's court, Vimalathithan is imprisoned in front of the palace gate. Vimalathithan tells all the townspeople of how Bala Devar is the reason for his imprisonment and that the whole empire will face ruin. Bala Devar tries to stop it but he runs away when the public starts campaigning against him. Bala Devar meets with Poonkudi to discuss Rajaraja's downfall. Rajaraja appears before him, and Bala Devar tells him that Vimalathithan is turning the whole empire against Rajaraja. Kundavi visits her lover in the prison, and he tells her that it is because of Bala Devar. Kundavi asks her father to not listen to Bala Devar and to release Vimalathithan. Rajaraja agrees to do so provided that Vengi make concessions that Kundavi and Rajendra find unacceptable.

Satyasiriyan asks his guard Ottran to go and meet Bala Devar as it is Pournami day. Ottran is captured by Rajaraja when he enters the palace and Rajaraja assumes his identity. Bala Devar tells him to inform Satyasiriyan that on the eve of Rajajrja's birthday he plans to invite the emperor that night for a feast and poison him during the feast, and that Poonkodi is volunteering to aid them. Rajajraja leaves and Bala Devar gives the poison to Poonkodi. They invite him for the feast but Rajaraja tells them that he will only have milk and fruits. Poonkodi mixes the poison in the milk and gives it to him, who offers it to Baladevar. The king informs him that he plans to kill Vimalathithan and get Kundavi married to Satryasiriyan's son, and would not drink the milk as Poonkodi has poisoned the milk. Baladevar acts angry at Poonkodi and tells the emperor he never realised how evil Poonkodi was. The king says that no point finding her as all prisoners shall be released the next day. Bala Devar acts and cries about what could have happened to the Empire if Rajaraja would have been poisoned.

The next morning, all the kings in the empire pay their respects to Rajaraja, and Vimalathithan is released and sings a song praising the emperor. Rajaraja grants him a wish, and Vimalathithan asks for the emperor's daughter. Bala Devar questions Rajaraja and tells him that Satyasiriyan will attack. Rajaraja reveals that Poonkodi is a Chola spy who works for him, and he already knew of Bala Devar's schemes.

Tamizarasi completes her notes, and the two couples get married.

Cast 

 Sivaji Ganesan as Rajaraja Cholan
 Vijayakumari as Cholama Devi
 R. Muthuraman as Prince Vimalathithan of (later king) Vengai Nattu Thalaivan
 Sivakumar as Rajendra Chola I Crown Prince
 Lakshmi as Kundhavai
 Kumari Padmini as Rajendra Cholan
 M. N. Nambiar as Bala Devar
 R. S. Manohar as Sathyasiriyan
 Pushpalatha as Sathyasiriyan wife
 T. R. Mahalingam as Karuvur Devar
 Sirkazhi Govindarajan as Nambiyandar Nambi
 S. Varalakshmi as Kundavai Pirāttiyār
 Suruli Rajan as Palace Servant
 Manorama as Poonkodi
 A. Sakunthala as Dancer
 K. D. Santhanam as Sirpy
 MLA Thangaraj
 Oru Viral Krishna Rao
 Ganthimathi
 S. N. Parvathy
 Master Sekhar as Ponna

Production 
Rajaraja Cholan, based on the life of the Chola king Rajaraja I was a play written by Aru. Ramanthan, and staged by the TKS Brothers in 1955. In 1973, it was adapted into a film by the same name, directed by A. P. Nagarajan and produced by G. Umapathy; Sivaji Ganesan, a self-described Chola, was cast in the title role. Umapathy wanted to film in Brihadisvara Temple, Thanjavur, but as he was denied permission, an identical set was constructed in Vasu Studios. Rajaraja Cholan was the first CinemaScope film to be released in South India (Tamil).

Soundtrack 
The soundtrack album was composed by Kunnakudi Vaidyanathan. The lyrics were written by Tirunavukkarasar, Kannadasan, K. D. Santhanam, Poovai Senguttuvan and 'Ulunthurpettai' Shanmugham.

Release 
Rajaraja Cholan was released on 31 March 1973. The film's prints were taken to theatres atop an elephant. In Tiruchirappalli, fans hired a helicopter and showered flower petals on the print. According to Ganesan, the film did not succeed commercially because "it was not filmed well enough to bring out the ambience or the magnificence of the emperor's personality", and was filmed on the lines of a "family drama". Nonetheless, the film ran for over 100 days in theatres.

Reception 
The Hindu said, "A great deal of thought and effort has gone into Anand Movies' Raja Raja Chozhan in CinemaScope produced by G. Umapathy and directed by A. P. Nagarajan. The grandeur, majesty and the culture and prosperity of the golden era of Raja Raja Chozhan have been captured faithfully including the building of the Thanjavur temple". The Indian Express said, "The film is lavishly mounted. Muthuraman and Lakshmi impress and Kumari Padmini has given a good account of herself". The Mail said, "As befitting the distinction, it is lavishly mounted, carefully produced and studded with stars. Producer G. Umapathy merits a pat on the back for steering so huge a project safely home". Kanthan of Kalki called it a respite for audiences tired of watching repeated, identical films.

References

Bibliography

External links 
 

1970s biographical films
1970s historical films
1970s Tamil-language films
1973 films
CinemaScope films
Films directed by A. P. Nagarajan
Films scored by Kunnakudi Vaidyanathan
Films set in the Chola Empire
Films with screenplays by A. P. Nagarajan
Indian biographical films
Indian epic films
Indian films based on plays
Indian historical films